Vietnam is the easternmost country on the Indochina Peninsula in Southeast Asia. For much of its history, Vietnam was a predominantly agricultural civilization based on wet rice cultivation. There is also an industry for bauxite mining in Vietnam, an important material for the production of aluminum. The Vietnamese economy is shaped primarily by the Vietnamese Communist Party in Five Year Plans made through the plenary sessions of the Central Committee and national congresses.

Manufacturing, information technology and high-tech industries now form a large and fast-growing part of the national economy. In 2010, Vietnam was ranked as the 8th largest crude petroleum producers in the Asia and Pacific region. Like its Chinese neighbours, Vietnam continues to make use of centrally planned economic five-year plans.

For further information on the types of business entities in this country and their abbreviations, see "Business entities in Vietnam".

Largest firms 
This list shows firms in the 2017 Forbes Global 2000, which ranks firms based on four measures: sales, profit, assets and market value. The list only includes publicly traded firms.

Notable firms 
This list includes notable companies with primary headquarters located in the country. The industry and sector follow the Industry Classification Benchmark taxonomy. Organizations which have ceased operations are included and noted as defunct.

See also 
 List of airlines of Vietnam
 List of banks in Vietnam

References 

Vietnam